Pearle Vision is an American chain of eye care stores. It is one of the largest franchised optical retailers in North America. The company was acquired by Luxottica, an Italian eyewear company, in 2004. As of December 31, 2018, Pearle Vision operated 110 corporate stores and had 419 franchises throughout North America.

History 
It was founded in 1961 by Stanley Pearle, an optometrist in Savannah, Georgia, United States. In 1971, Pearle purchased a 17-store optical chain owned by Robert Hillman and Larry Kohan; together, Hillman and Kohan stayed on and helped to expand Pearle Vision nationwide. By the 1970s the chain was owned by G. D. Searle Pharmaceutical, with founder Stanley Pearle serving as a board member.

Stanley Pearle sold his stores to British conglomerate Grand Metropolitan in 1985. Grand Met expanded Pearle Vision to more than 1,000 locations worldwide by 1990, but profits became elusive. In 1996, Grand Met sold the Pearle stores in the United States, Canada and Puerto Rico to Cole National Corporation, which operated optical departments inside such retail stores as Sears, BJ's Wholesale Club and Target. In 1997 Cole National bought the 150-store NuVision chain in Michigan and converted them to the Pearle Vision name. The Belgian stores were sold to GIB in Belgium and the Dutch stores to HAL Investments in the Netherlands. HAL Investments bought the Belgian stores 1 year later from GIB and merged both chains into Pearle Benelux.  

Luxottica, owner of LensCrafters, purchased Cole National in 2004, a deal that brought together the two largest eyewear retailers in the United States.

The Pearle chain of opticians in Europe is now part of Grandvision and has more than 1000 branches in 43 countries including the Netherlands (pearle.nl), Belgium, Germany (Apollo-Optik), Austria (pearle.at), Poland, Portugal, Italy, Finland and Estonia. For more than 40 years the company has been selling branded products and products under its own brand name.

The first Pearle Optical store in the Middle East opened in Marina Mall, Kuwait, on January 15, 2003, and currently operates 18 stores in the Middle East: 4 in Kuwait, 10 in KSA, 3 in UAE, 5 in Egypt and 1 in Qatar.

Notably, Pearle Vision has repeatedly experienced difficulty operating successfully in California. Its traditional business model directly conflicts with California's strong consumer protection statutes which are designed to prevent the obvious conflict of interest that arises when an optometrist and an optician practice side by side in the same business (one can prescribe more eyewear to be made by the other, thus inflating the overall profits of the business).  On June 12, 2006, the Supreme Court of California ruled that Pearle Vision could not escape the reach of those statutes, and Pearle Vision's attempts to find a loophole through the Knox-Keene Health Care Service Plan Act of 1975 were unavailing.

Stanley Pearle died on July 21, 2011. He is survived by three children, 10 grandchildren and 11 great‐grandchildren.

References

External links 

consumeraffairs.co

Luxottica
Eyewear retailers of the United States
American companies established in 1961
Retail companies established in 1961
Eyewear retailers of Canada
Eyewear companies of the United States
2004 mergers and acquisitions